Menién is an extinct language related to Kamakã. It is one of the Macro-Jê languages of Brazil.

References

Extinct languages of South America
Kamakã languages
Indigenous languages of Northeastern Brazil